Anthony Baffoe (born 25 May 1965) is a football business manager and former player who is the Deputy General Secretary of the Confederation of African Football. He played as a defender. As the son of a Ghanaian diplomat, Baffoe was born and raised near to the former West German capital of Bonn and made a name for himself in the 1980s in the Bundesliga, becoming a real crowd favourite for 1. FC Köln and Fortuna Düsseldorf. He represented  the Ghana national team at international level.

Club career
Baffoe was born in Bad Godesberg, Bonn, West Germany. Much-travelled, he played for clubs on four different continents. He spent the majority of his career in the Bundesliga and 2. Bundesliga, starting in 1983 at 1. FC Köln at 18 years of age before moving across the border to join French side FC Metz nearly ten years later. Baffoe was one of the first recognized black player to appear in the Bundesliga. After 74 German top flight appearances for Köln and Fortuna Düsseldorf merely he played for a further seven clubs, including spells in Hong Kong and Caracas.

International career
Baffoe was the first Ghanaian expatriate player to play for the Ghana national team. He was capped 25 times for the Black Stars, notably at 1992 and 1994 African Cup of Nations.

Retirement
After his playing career Baffoe used his broad popularity to set up and front a new TV magazine show devoted to youth football. He was successful on German television in various sport programmes and is the regular host of Viasat One's Uefa Champions League show in Ghana. After a few years, the former defensive utility man evolved into a well-known representative of the African continent and his home country of Ghana.

Managerial career
Currently Baffoe is the Deputy Secretary General for Football&Development for (CAF),He previously served on FIFA and CAF Football Committees. He was also involved in organizing  CAF and FIFA sanctioned tournaments. In February 2006 he was named "Director for International Relations" for the Ghana national team. He is the founder and General Secretary of the Professional Footballers Association of Ghana. In that capacity is in close contact with the FIFPro Players' association and works in collaboration with the Ghana Football Association.

Baffoe is a FIFA Ambassador for campaign against racism, a FIFA ambassador for SOS Children's Village and an ambassador for Play Soccer Ghana.

Personal life
Baffoe is married to Kalsoume Sinare, a Ghanaian actress and they both have three children, Shaquille, Boukeem and Keisheira. Baffoe is the brother of German actress Liz Baffoe, who is famous for her role in the German TV series Lindenstraße.

References

External links
 
 

1965 births
Living people
Sportspeople from Bonn
Businesspeople from Bonn
German sportspeople of Ghanaian descent
Citizens of Ghana through descent
Association football defenders
German footballers
Ghanaian footballers
Ghana international footballers
1992 African Cup of Nations players
1994 African Cup of Nations players
1. FC Köln players
1. FC Köln II players
Rot-Weiß Oberhausen players
Stuttgarter Kickers players
SC Fortuna Köln players
Fortuna Düsseldorf players
FC Metz players
OGC Nice players
Sun Hei SC players
Caracas FC players
Bundesliga players
2. Bundesliga players
Ligue 1 players
German expatriate footballers
German expatriate sportspeople in France
Expatriate footballers in France
Expatriate footballers in Hong Kong
German expatriate sportspeople in Venezuela
Expatriate footballers in Venezuela
Footballers from North Rhine-Westphalia